Nabil Shaban (born 12 February 1953) is a Jordanian-British actor and writer. He co-founded Graeae—a theatre group which promotes disabled performers. He's best known as the recurring villain Sil in Doctor Who.

Early years and career

Shaban was born in Amman, Jordan, with brittle bone disease osteogenesis imperfecta. He was sent to England for medical care, where he grew up in a series of hospitals and residential homes. He studied at the University of Surrey in the late 1970s and contributed to the Students' Union newspaper "Bare Facts". In 1997, Shaban was awarded an honorary doctorate by the university for services in the promotion of Disability Arts.

One of his most memorable television roles was that of the reptilian alien Sil in the BBC science fiction television series Doctor Who. Shaban played Sil in two serials: Vengeance on Varos (1985) and Mindwarp (1986), and created Sil's laugh. He reprised the role in the Big Finish audio dramas Mission to Magnus (2009) and Antidote to Oblivion (2013), both again written by Philip Martin. Shaban again played Sil in 2019 in Reeltime Pictures' web series production of Sil and the Devil Seeds of Arodor (2019), again written by Philip Martin.

He has appeared in several films, including Born of Fire (1983), City of Joy (1992), Derek Jarman's Wittgenstein (1993), Gaias børn (1998), and Children of Men (2006), and has also worked as part of the Crass Collective. In 2011, he played the Roman emperor Constantius II at the National Theatre in Ibsen's Emperor and Galilean.

In 2003 he made a TV documentary titled The Strangest Viking (part of Channel 4's Secret History series), in which Shaban explored the possibility that Viking chieftain Ivar the Boneless may have had osteogenesis imperfecta, the same condition he himself has. Shaban has also published a trilogy of Ivarr the Boneless screenplays on Kindle, representing the Viking chieftain as a disabled Danish prince with brittle bones and unable to walk.

Shaban was nominated Best Actor in Scottish theatre in 2005, by the Critics' Awards for Theatre in Scotland (CATS), for his role as Mack the Knife in Bertolt Brecht's Threepenny Opera, a Theatre Workshop (Edinburgh) production. Shaban lost out to rival nominee David Tennant, who was about to become the Tenth Doctor in Doctor Who.

Shaban's play The First To Go premièred in May 2008, produced by Edinburgh's Benchtours Theatre Company in association with Sirius Pictures. It opened at the Lyceum Theatre in Edinburgh on 23 May and toured to the Tron Theatre, Glasgow; the Byre Theatre, St Andrews and Lawrence Batley Theatre, Huddersfield.

Credits

Television

TV documentaries
Co-wrote and presented "The Skin Horse", 1984 Channel Four
Co-wrote and presented "The Fifth Gospel", 1990 BBC TV
Presented "Rejects and Super Crips", Channel Four
Presented "Children of Gaia", 1997, Milton Media, Denmark
Writer, producer, director, host "The Alien Who Lived in the Sheds", 1997, BBC TV
Associate producer and presenter "The Strangest Viking", 2003, Channel Four
Researcher, co-writer and presenter "Return of the Star People", 2003, Zentropa, Denmark.

TV drama
Ben Gunn, "Walter", 1982, Channel Four
Sil, Doctor Who, 1985-86, BBC TV
Bill, Raspberry Ripple, 1988, BBC TV
The Emperor, 1988, BBC TV
Charlie aka God, Billy's Christmas Angels, 1988
Iranian Nights, 1989, Channel Four
Tom, Deptford Graffiti, Channel 4, 1991
Alan, Skallagrig, 1994 BBC TV
South of the Border BBC TV
Inmates, BBC TV
Lawyer, Sorry About Last Night, 1995 BBC TV

Radio/audio
 Benn Gunn in "Treasure Island" BBC Radio 4, 1994
 Jaturi in "The Ramayan" BBC Radio 3, 1994
 "Pie in the Sky", BBC Radio 4, 1995
 Firdaus Kanga in "Trying to Grow", BBC Radio 4, 1995
 Danda in "Tales of the Great Unwashed", 2005, Resonance FM
 Sil in "Doctor Who: Mission to Magnus”, Big Finish Audio, 2009
 Sil in “Doctor Who: Antidote to Oblivion”, Big Finish Audio, 2013

Feature films
 Born of Fire, 1986
 City of Joy, 1992
 Age of Treason, 1993
 Wittgenstein, 1993
 Slave of Dreams, 1995
 Children of Men, 2007
 Trouble Sleeping, 2008
 Morticia, 2009
 Sil and the Devil Seeds of Arodor, 2019

Producer/director/writer
 Another World (purchased by BBC TV), 1995
 The Alien who lived in the Sheds, BBC TV, 1997 (won 2 awards)
 The Skin Horse (won Royal Television Society Award, Emmy Award)
 Reports Action Appeal, Granada TV (won the Co-operative Society TV Award)
 Gandhi; an Inspiration, BBC Radio World Service, 1983
 Telephone Dummies, BBC TV drama, 1984
 The Fifth Gospel, BBC TV Everyman documentary, 1990
 King of the Incurables (screenplay), 1990
 Circus Nightmare (screenplay), 1991
 Another World, funded by Arts Council of England, 1995
 D.A.R.E., Theatre Workshop, 1996–97
 The First To Go, Graeae Theatre, 1996
 The Inheritance (screenplay), BFI, 1997
 The Alien who lived in the Sheds, BBC TV, 1997
 I am the Walrus (one actor stage play), Theatre Workshop, 2001
 Crip Triptych (music drama documentary), 2006
 Morticia (film drama), 2009

References

Further reading
Dreams my Father Sold Me — poetry and artworks by Nabil Shaban
The First To Go: An Original Play About Disabled People in Nazi Germany –  by Nabil Shaban
D.A.R.E. (Disabled Anarchists' Revolutionary Enclave) – Play (theatre) – by Nabil Shaban, Robert Rae, Jim McSharry, Daryl Beeton, and John Hollywood
The Ripper Code – Fiction Crime Thriller – by Nabil Shaban
Diary of the Absurd – Surreal Fiction – by Nabil Shaban
The Saga of Ivar the Boneless Viking Historical Fiction [Kindle Edition]

External links
 
 Nabil Shaban's books at Amazon
 Nabil Shaban's ScabsNabs YouTube Channel
 Nabil Shaban's 2BenefitPeople YouTube Channel

Living people
1953 births
Jordanian emigrants to the United Kingdom
People from Amman
British people with disabilities
People with osteogenesis imperfecta
Alumni of the University of Surrey
English male film actors
English male television actors
Actors with disabilities
Television presenters with disabilities